7 Naatkal ( 7 days) is a 2017 Tamil language mystery thriller film directed by Gautham VR and written by P. Vimal Kumar. The film stars Shakthi and Nikesha Patel alongside an ensemble cast of Prabhu, Ganesh Venkatraman, Nassar, Angana Roy, Rajeev Govinda Pillai, and M. S. Bhaskar, among others, playing supporting roles. The music was composed by Vishal Chandrasekhar with cinematography done by M. S. Prabhu and editing by M. Jesvin Prabu. The film was released on 2 June 2017 to moderate success.

Plot

The plot starts off with the murder of Jennifer (Angana Roy), a ballet dancer. Owing to evidence and assumptions, all fingers point to Siddharth (Rajeev Govinda Pillai), the son of Vijay Raghunath (Prabhu), a business tycoon. Vijay is worried over his son's future as the latter's engagement has been fixed. He seeks the help of his adopted son, Sai Prasad (Ganesh Venkatraman), a crime branch officer. Prasad starts investigating the issue with the help of his assistant, Bhaskar (M. S. Bhaskar).

The investigation takes them to Gautham Krishna (Shakthi Vasudevan), an RJ in a private FM station, and his neighbour Pooja (Nikesha Patel). Prasad is after a confidential DVD which was once possessed by Gautham's friend, who is no more. Knowing that the DVD is with Pooja, the henchmen set by Prasad kidnap her and start following Gautham's movements. Gautham, who gets a lead about Pooja from his pet Siberian Husky, Blackie, rescues her, and the two set out to solve the mystery of the case, with the help of Peter S. Kumar (Nassar), a former police officer.

Cast

 Shakthi Vasudevan as  Gautham Krishna
 Nikesha Patel as Pooja 
 Prabhu as Vijay Raghunath
 Ganesh Venkatraman as Sai Prasad
 Nassar as Peter S. Kumar 
 Angana Roy as Jennifer 
 Rajeev Govinda Pillai as Siddharth Raghunath
 M. S. Bhaskar as Bhaskar
 Devadarshini as Gautham's sister
 Santhana Bharathi as Chief Minister
 Chinni Jayanth as P. K. Naidu
 Vishnu Balasubramanian
 Master Raghavan as Anush
 Baby Visishta Reddy as Srinidhi

Production
In April 2016, it was announced that Shakthi would feature in a new film titled 7 Naatkal directed by his cousin  Gautham and written by his uncle,  Vimal peethambaram. The film production started on 21 April 2016, with Nikesha Patel, Ganesh Venkatraman and Angana Roy revealed to have joined the cast. M. S. Prabhu joined the team as a cinematographer, while Vishal Chandrasekhar was signed on as the project's music composer. Contrary to reports, Ganesh revealed that he portrayed an Antagonist role and stated that the film would be a "racy thriller" which takes place over seven days as per the title. The first schedule was shot across Chennai, while the team also nurtured plans to shoot songs abroad.

Soundtrack
The soundtrack was composed by Vishal Chandrasekhar, and lyrics written by Madhan Karky. Behindwoods rated the soundtrack 2 out of 5.

Critical reception
Times of India wrote "7 Naatkal has its moments, especially in the first half, with a few light-hearted scenes which gradually build up to an engaging suspense drama." News Minute wrote "The film struggles to entertain with flat comedy, badly constructed song sequences, and attempts to score on the emotional quotient with some blah sentimental scenes as well."

References

External links
 

2017 films
2010s Tamil-language films
2010s mystery thriller films
Indian mystery thriller films
Films shot in Chennai
Films scored by Vishal Chandrasekhar
2017 directorial debut films